Juan Carlos Sáez (born 7 June 1961) is a Spanish rower. He competed in the men's lightweight double sculls event at the 1996 Summer Olympics.

References

1961 births
Living people
Spanish male rowers
Olympic rowers of Spain
Rowers at the 1996 Summer Olympics
Sportspeople from Madrid